Yao Yan (born 22 August 1988) is a female Chinese international table tennis player.

She won the bronze medal at the 2009 World Table Tennis Championships – Mixed Doubles with Zhang Chao.

Yao Yan is married to table tennis player Xu Xin.

See also
 List of table tennis players

References

Table tennis players from Shanghai
Living people
1988 births
Chinese female table tennis players
World Table Tennis Championships medalists